The 1893–94 season was Northwich Victoria's second, and final season in the Football League. They competed in the 15 team Football League Second Division, which they had been a founding member of the previous season. The league was then the second tier of English football, where they finished 15th. Northwich were eliminated from the 1893–94 FA Cup in the fourth qualifying round, after being beaten 1–0 at home by Crewe Alexandra.

Season synopsis
The season began for Northwich on 2 September 1893, away to Grimsby Town, where they were convincingly defeated 7–0.

On 3 February 1894, Northwich met Liverpool for the first time since beating them in the FA Cup the previous season, meeting this time in the League. Liverpool won the game convincingly 4-0 in front of 3,000 spectators at Anfield, with goals from Thomas Bradshaw, Duncan McClean and two goals from James Stott.

Northwich's return fixture against Liverpool was played on 28 March at the Drill Field, again in front of around 3,000 spectators. Failing to make amends for the earlier season defeat, Northwich were beaten 3-2.

First-team squad
This is the squad who faced Liverpool F.C. on 3 February 1894.

Below are other players who played for Northwich during this season.

Table

References

 
 

Northwich Victoria F.C. seasons
Northwich Victoria